Thamnophis sauritus septentrionalis, the northern ribbon snake, is a subspecies of garter snake. It is one of four subspecies of the ribbon snake (Thamnophis sauritus) and occurs in the United States and Canada in southern Maine, southern Ontario, Michigan, New York, Nova Scotia, northern Minnesota, Ohio, Illinois, and Indiana. It is listed as a state endangered species in Wisconsin. It is a slender black or brown snake with three bright-yellow or white stripes on its back and sides. The head is black, with the scales alongside the mouth being white. The underside is also white or light yellow, but it is mostly white on juveniles and adults.

Ribbon snakes inhabit marshes or live near the edges of lakes, ponds, and streams. They swim well, and their diets include frogs, tadpoles, salamanders, small fish, and insects.

Northern ribbon snakes have from 3 to 26 young, which are born in late summer. As most garter snakes, the mother gives birth to live young (ovoviviparous).

References

External links
 Archive of Thamnophis site with many pictures

sauritus septentrionalis
Snakes of North America
Snake, Northern Ribbon
Reptiles of the United States
Reptiles of Canada
Subspecies
Taxa named by Douglas A. Rossman